The 2021 World Mountain and Trail Running Championships (abbreviated WMTRC 2021) was an inaugural event which combined the World Mountain Running Championships and IAU Trail World Championships. The event was organised by the World Mountain Running Association, International Trail Running Association and International Association of Ultrarunners sanctioned by World Athletics. It was held in Chiang Mai, Thailand, from November 4–6, 2022.

Schedule 
Although the WMTRC 2021 was originally scheduled to be held during November 11-14, 2021, it was postponed to November 2022 due to the COVID-19 pandemic.

The schedule is as follows.

 Friday, November 4 – 10:15 am – VERTICAL MOUNTAIN (vertical) race, from the Chiang Mai International Exhibition and Convention Centre to Khun Chang Khian village.
 Saturday, November 5 – 6:30 am –  TRAIL ( meters vertical) race, from the Chiang Mai International Exhibition and Convention Centre to Khun Chang Khian village, Doi Pui, and back down.
 Saturday, November 5 – 7:30 am –  TRAIL ( meters vertical) race, from the Chiang Mai International Exhibition and Convention Centre to Khun Chang Khian village, down to Huay Tung Tao reservoir, up to Khun Chang Khian village and back down to the convention centre.
 Sunday, November 6 – 8:30 am –  CLASSIC MOUNTAIN ( meters vertical) up and down races.
 Sunday, November 6 – 8:30 am –  CLASSIC MOUNTAIN ( meters vertical) up and down races.

Medal summary

Medal table

Men's events 
Results for men's events:

Women's events

Results

2022 World Mountain Running Championships Uphill Men's Results 

a: Kenyan athletes missed the race call-time but were given leniency by the race organisers.
b: Uganda athletes missed the start after accidentally travelling to finish of the course at the top of the mountain.

2022 World Mountain Running Championships Uphill Men's Team Standings

2022 Trail World Championships 40k Men's Results

2022 Trail World Championships 40k Men's Team Standings

2022 Trail World Championships 80k Men's Results

2022 World Mountain Running Championships Men's Up & Downhill (11.2km) Results

2022 World Mountain Running Championships Men's Up & Downhill (11.2km) Team Standings

2022 World Mountain Running Championships 6.5 km U20 Men's Results

2022 World Mountain Running Championships 6.5 km U20 Men's Team Standings

2022 World Mountain Running Championships Uphill Mountain Women's Results

2022 World Mountain Running Championships Uphill Mountain Women's Team Standings

2022 Trail World Championships 40k Women's Results

2022 World Mountain Running Championships 40k Women's Team Standings

2022 Trail World Championships 80k Women's Results

2022 Trail World Championships 80k Women's Team Standing

2022 World Mountain Running Championships 11.2 km Women's Results

2022 World Mountain Running Championships Up and Downhill Mountain 11.2 km Women's Race Team Standing

2022 World Mountain Running Championships 6.5 km U20 Women's Results

2022 World Mountain Running Championships 6.5 km U20 Women's Team Standings

References

External links 
 

Live Stream
 2022 World Mountain and Trail Running Championships

Results
 Amazing Thailand World Mountain and Trail Running Championships 2022 presented by NSDF
 Recap irunfar.com

World Mountain and Trail Running Championships
World Mountain and Trail Running Championships
World Mountain and Trail Running Championships
International athletics competitions hosted by Thailand
Sport in Chiang Mai
World Mountain and Trail Running Championships, 2021